Morris Trachsler (born 15 July 1984) is a retired Swiss professional ice hockey player and the current CFO of Seervision AG.

Playing career
He participated at the 2010 IIHF World Championship as a member of the Switzerland men's national ice hockey team. He won a total of 104 caps for the Swiss team.

At the club level, he played for the GC Küsnacht Lions in the National League B, the ZSC Lions, Genève-Servette HC and again the ZSC Lions in the National League A (NLA). In 2014, he captured the Swiss championship with the Lions. On May 8, 2017, Trachsler left the Lions for their biggest rival, EHC Kloten, on a 2-year deal, but parted ways with the club after the conclusion of the 2017-18 season. He announced his retirement in November 2018.

Career statistics

Regular season and playoffs

International

Academic Career 
From 2006 to 2009, Traschler completed his Bachelor's degree in economics at the University of Geneva, after which, in 2012, he completed his Master of Science in Economics also at UNIGE.

Professional career 
After retiring from hockey in November of 2018, Trachsler also left his role as a consultant and joined Seervision as the CFO.

References

External links

1984 births
Living people
GCK Lions players
Genève-Servette HC players
Ice hockey players at the 2014 Winter Olympics
Olympic ice hockey players of Switzerland
Swiss ice hockey forwards
Ice hockey people from Zürich
ZSC Lions players